The Bachelor's Club is a 1921 British silent comedy film directed by A. V. Bramble and starring Ben Field, Ernest Thesiger and Mary Brough. It was based on the 1891 novel The Bachelor's Club by Israel Zangwill.

Cast
 Ben Field as Peter Parker
 Ernest Thesiger as Israfel Mondego
 Mary Brough as Mrs. Parker
 Sydney Fairbrother as Tabitha
 Arthur Pusey as Paul Dickray
 Margot Drake as Jenny Halby
 James Lindsay as Eliot Dickray
 Sidney Paxton as Caleb Twinkletop
 A.G. Poulton as Edward Halby
 Arthur Cleave as Warlock Combs
 Dora Lennox as Israfel's Sweetheart
 Jack Denton as Mandeville Brown
 Alice De Winton as Dowager

References

External links
 

1921 films
British comedy films
British silent feature films
Films directed by A. V. Bramble
1921 comedy films
Ideal Film Company films
British black-and-white films
1920s English-language films
1920s British films
Silent comedy films